The Apostolic Nunciature to Gratz was an ecclesiastical office of the Catholic Church located in Gratz, Austria. It was a diplomatic post of the Holy See, whose representative is called the Apostolic Nuncio with the rank of an ambassador. The office ceased to exist in 1622 soon after the accession of Ferdinand II as Holy Roman Emperor.

See also
 Apostolic Nunciature to Austria
 Foreign relations of the Holy See
 List of diplomatic missions of the Holy See

References

Diplomatic missions in Austria
Gratz
Austria–Holy See relations